Percy Wyer (23 January 1884 – 12 June 1965) was a Canadian long-distance runner. He competed in the marathon at the 1928 Summer Olympics and the 1936 Summer Olympics.

References

1884 births
1965 deaths
People from the Metropolitan Borough of Dudley
English emigrants to Canada
Athletes (track and field) at the 1928 Summer Olympics
Athletes (track and field) at the 1936 Summer Olympics
Canadian male long-distance runners
Canadian male marathon runners
Olympic track and field athletes of Canada
Athletes (track and field) at the 1930 British Empire Games
Athletes (track and field) at the 1934 British Empire Games
Commonwealth Games competitors for Canada